Mohsen Badawi (born November 10, 1956, in Cairo, Egypt) is an entrepreneur, political activist, and writer.

Biography

Mohsen Badawi went to the Jésuites school in Cairo and graduated from Cairo University he is the Chairman of Abdurrahman Badawi Center for Creativity since January 2008, the Chairman of Aracom Systems since 1984, co-founder of the Egyptian Soviet Chamber of Commerce (1989), the main founder and first Chairman of the Canada Egypt Business Council "CEBC" (2001–2003), member of the Egyptian Romanian Friendship Association (1988–1991), member of the Arab Scientific Transportation Association (1989-) and a member of The Egyptian International Economic Forum] (2003-).
He has been included in the International Who's Who gazette since the 1991/1992 edition.

Personal life
He currently resides in Cairo, Egypt. He is the great-nephew of Abdel Rahman Badawi.

Published work

Mohsen Badawi published his first article in Al Akhbar (Egypt)  newspaper (1991), published several articles in Sout El-Omma , Al-Ahram , El Fagr , Al-Mal , Al-Gamaheer , Nahdet Masr , El Karamah  and Al-Masri Al-Youm  Egyptian Arabic newspapers.
Also he published his first book in 2009 where he collected the political articles wrote by the Egyptian philosopher Abdurrahman Badawi between 1938 and 1967, the book contains 106 articles covering various aspects and periods in the political history of the region and the world starting by World War II, the Egyptian revolution in 1952, Indian politics and political philosophy, the American spirit and unity and many others

References

External links
Personal website
Abdurrahman Badawi Center for Creativity
The Canadian Trade Commissioner Service
Ministry of Finance, Egypt

Al-Ahram Hebdo
BBCArabic.com
Al-Ahram Hebdo
Alwasat Party
Al Asala Foundation
Al Jazeera
Al Nabaa News Agency
Akhbar El Adab
Akhbar El yom newspaper
El Akhbar newspaper
Alrai Alaam newspaper
Al Yom
Al Ahram Al Arabi
El Akhbar newspaper
Abdel Waley El Shimery
Alhayat newspaper
Al Ahram Al Arabi
Akhbar El Yom
Al Qanat

1956 births
Living people
Businesspeople from Cairo
Journalists from Cairo
Egyptian politicians